"Nimmi Nimmi" (lit: Moist) is a 2014 single by the Pakistani rock band Overload. It was released on November 24, 2014, in Pakistan as a digital download, Regarded as a most awaited released by band, it is their first single after almost a year.  "Nimmi Nimmi" is a soulful-love ballad in which male protagonist vows to his lover with her memories after being left alone. The song is written, directed and produced by Farhad while Sheraz serves as a co-producer and synthesizer.

Nimmi Nimmi received mixed reviews by critics and was listened to 4000 times on SoundCloud in the first 24 hours after release. At 3rd Annual Hum Awards ceremony, it was nominated for Best Music Single for Farhad Humayun.

About the song
The song is written, directed and produced by Farhad, while co-produced by Sheraz. Farhad describing their inspiration behind the song as "All my work is reflective of myself, feelings matter more to me than thoughts. So when I think of visuals I’m conscious of how an image makes me feel rather than what I think of it." he further expressed, "I have always been extremely observant of my surroundings and tried capturing feelings more than thoughts. My videos are a collage of visuals that I like to picture in my head. The song Nimmi Nimmi came together on its own. The music and words seemed to find their way together at the studio when Sheraz (Keyboardist of Overload) played some chords casually on the piano. Overload has always been my outlet to express my feelings without caring about whatever rules or trends the music industry is following."

Music video

Synopsis
Video depicts a man who possessed all worldly pleasures but still senses a void caused by parting from his lover. Male protagonist is living with all luxuries of life but still has a whole place missing in him, when he look around in his house, he sees her in every place she had been, he vows for her comeback and desperately is in love with her.

Cast and Crew
Following is the list of brief artist that work with this record:

 Singer: Farhad Humayun
 Featuring Artist: Farhad Humayun and Shahbano
 Lyricist: Raheel Joseph, Farhad Humayun and Tahir Shaheer 
 Music video director: Farhad Humayun
 Record Producers: Farhad Humayun and Sheraz Siddiq
 Record Label: Riot Studios
 Personnel
 Composer: Farhad Humayun and Sheraz Siddiq
 Audio mastering: Frank Arkwright
 Guitarist: Sarmad Ghafoor
 Bass: Farhan Ali
 Keyboards: Sheraz Siddiq
 Dhol: Nasair Sain

Track listing

Digital download (2014 version)
"Nimmi Nimmi"  featuring Farhad Humayun and Shah bano — 5:26

Reception
With its release it tops the chart, After its release on digital media, song was listened by 4,000 SoundCloud with 35,607 views and gets 1300 shares on Facebook within less than 24 hours.

Accolades
The single receives following nomination at 2015 Hum Awards:

See also
 "Shikva" by Faakhir
 "Roiyaan" by Farhan Saeed

References

External links
 
 Nimmi Nimmi on Dailymotion
 Nimmi Nimmi on ARY Musik
 Nimmi Nimmi on SoundCloud
 Nimmi Nimmi at ITunes

2014 songs
2014 singles